The Anakeion or Anacaeum (from the Greek ), also known as the Sanctuary of the Dioskouroi, was a temple in Athens, which was situated near the Acropolis and dedicated to Castor and Pollux.

Name and location 

The Old Agora, the predecessor of the Classical Agora, was used in the fifth century and before as a rallying point, and references in Andokides and Thucydides to musters at the Anakeion in 415 and 411 BCE have led scholars to conclude that the Anakeion may have lain within the vicinity of the Old Agora, perhaps to the east of the Acropolis.

Decoration 

The decoration of the Anakeion, according to Pausanias, fell to Mikon and Polygnotos. The former depicted the Argonauts, the followers of Jason, with particular attention to Akastos and his horses. Polygnotos depicted the Rape of the Leukippides: the forcible abduction and marriage of Phoebe and Hilaeira, daughters of Leukippos, by the Dioskouroi.  This painting may have earned him his Athenian citizenship.

Notes

References 

Greek temples
Ancient Greek buildings and structures in Athens
Temples in ancient Athens
Greek temples by deity